Hadi Jafari (born 4 August 1982) is an Iranian football midfielder who currently plays for Sepahan F.C. in the Iran Pro League.

Club career

Club career statistics

 Assist Goals

Honours

Club
Iran's Premier Football League
Winner: 1
2009/10 with Sepahan

References

1982 births
Living people
Iranian footballers
Association football midfielders
Sepahan S.C. footballers
Foolad Natanz players
Gostaresh Foulad F.C. players